Al-Watah ballistic missile base is a ballistic missile facility in the low but quite rocky mountains near the town of Al-Watah, Saudi Arabia, 200 km west-southwest of Riyadh.

Overview 
The analysts think that the base was built no earlier than 2008. The communication tower of the base is situated at coordinates: .
The base has several underground entry gates, parking slots for mobile launchers and two large launch pads that are identical to ones that can be seen at Chinese DF-3 (CSS-2) Dongfeng missile bases.
The liquid-fueled DF-3A is an early Chinese nuclear weapon Intermediate-range ballistic missile and is believed to have a range of 4,000 – 5,000 km with a 2,000 kg warhead. Michael Elleman and Joseph S. Bermudez Jr. stated that the site appears to have a rocket-engine production and test facility.

The launch pads' marks and configuration from satellite images show that the base is 'targeting Iran and Israel with ballistic missiles'.

Construction of the base likely began in 2013.

See also 

 List of military installations in Saudi Arabia

References

Military installations of Saudi Arabia
